Baló's concentric sclerosis is a disease in which the white matter of the brain appears damaged in concentric layers, leaving the axis cylinder intact. It was described by József Mátyás Baló who initially named it "leuko-encephalitis periaxialis concentrica" from the previous definition, and it is currently considered one of the borderline forms of multiple sclerosis.

Baló's concentric sclerosis is a demyelinating disease similar to standard multiple sclerosis, but with the particularity that the demyelinated tissues form concentric layers. Scientists used to believe that the prognosis was similar to Marburg multiple sclerosis, but now they know that patients can survive, or even have spontaneous remission and asymptomatic cases.

The concentric ring appearance is not specific to Baló's MS. Concentric lesions have also been reported in patients with neuromyelitis optica, standard MS, progressive multifocal leukoencephalopathy, cerebral autosomal dominant arteriopathy with subcortical infarcts, leukoencephalopathy, concomitant active hepatitis C and human herpes virus 6.

Pathophysiology

The lesions of the Baló's sclerosis belong to the MS lesion pattern III (distal oligodendrogliopathy). Balo concentric sclerosis is now believed to be a variant of pattern III multiple sclerosis and probably due to metabolic problems.

The Baló lesions show veins at their center, like those of MS, some suggestive of microhemorrhages or small ectatic venules. Unlike MS, no cortical gray matter lesions appear.

Theoretical models

According with Dr. Lucchinetti investigations, in Baló's concentric sclerosis, the rings may be caused by a physiological hypoxia (similar to that caused by some toxins or viruses) in the lesion, which is in turn countered by expression of stress proteins at the border. This expression and counter-expression forms rings of preserved tissue within the lesion and rings of demyelinated tissue just beyond where the previous attack had induced the protective stress proteins. Hence, subsequent attacks form concentric rings.

Some other researchers maintain that, as in pattern III MS, the mitochondrial respiratory chain complex IV activity is reduced and this could be the culprit of glutamate-mediated axonal injury.

Ultimately, this expanding lesion causes the progressive picture typically seen. However, in some patients, the pathology underlying the disease appears to burn out and hence the disease may halt, hence the patients who spontaneously recover. The mechanisms triggering attacks and recovery remain uncertain.

Nevertheless, this model is questioned by recent reports that found astrocyte damage, similar to the one found in aquaporin-seropositive neuromyelitis optica. Though no anti-NMO antibodies have been found, the damage is similar, pointing to problems in the water channel of the astrocytes

It presents three clinical subtypes: Monophasic, relapsing-remitting and primary rapidly progressive. Cerebrospinal fluid (CSF) is either normal or shows mild mononuclear inflammatory reaction. CSF-restricted oligoclonal bands are present only in a minority of cases

Other models

A mathematical model for concentric sclerosis has been proposed. Authors review the previous pathogenic theories, discuss the link between concentric sclerosis and Liesegang's periodic precipitation phenomenon and propose a new mechanism based on self-organization.

Clinical courses

The clinical course is primarily progressive, but a relapsing-remitting course has been reported. It seems that the course gets better with prednisone therapy, although evidence of this is anecdotal and such conclusions are difficult to accept given that there are cases where patients spontaneously recover whether the patient was on steroid therapy or not.

Baló lesions can disappear over time, but it has also been reported that the disease can convert to RRMS

The clinical course of Balo-like lesions also depends to the context in which they appear. Balo-like lesions have been reported in aquaporin-4 seropositive and seronegative NMOSD, and also in children, as part of an ADEM-like presentation

Diagnosis

Lesions under MRI are distinctive due to their natural concentric shape.

Under a lumbar puncture CSF test, with Baló's concentric sclerosis, as well as patients with pattern III lesions, were recently shown to be mostly negative for CSF-restricted oligoclonal bands. Also pattern III patients tend to be negative under the MRZ-reaction (measles, rubeola and zoster viruses)

Paediatric cases

Baló's concentric sclerosis in children has been reported to behave different from adults

Lesions in autopsy and biopsy

A report comparing 1H-magnetic resonance spectroscopy, magnetization transfer and diffusion tensor imaging with histopathology in a patient with Baló's concentric sclerosis, found that inflammation was traced by fractional anisotropy and increased lactate. In contrast, magnetization transfer ratio and the diffusion coefficient show a loss of tissue in the rings of the lesion.

Lesions under MRI

The features of the MRI and the characteristics of the lesion can be correlated when a biopsy has been taken, providing a way to standardize the future MRI diagnosis

Baló's concentric sclerosis lesions can be distinguished from normal lesions on MRI showing alternating hypointense and hyperintense layers

Baló's concentric lesions can be viewed using the myelin water imaging techniques. This is a special MRI sequence that shows the myelin's percentage of water content.

Pattern III lesions, including Baló lesions, have a specific initiation pattern under MRI (MRILIP) consisting in showing Gadolinium enhancement before FLAIR MRI appearance.

Under 7-Tesla MRI Ball lesions show a center vein, like in MS.

Treatment

Treatment with corticosteroids is usual to relieve inflammation.

Epidemiology

The disease is more common in Chinese and Filipino populations (both Asiatic) than in caucasoids.

Balo-like lesions have been reported to appear also in Tumefactive inflammatory leukoencephalopathy

Associations

A possible association with psoriasis and autoimmune thyroiditis has been reported

Pattern III (Baló-like) demyelinating spectrum

Baló-like lesions were classified as MS lesion pattern III in the MS spectrum. They have been reported alone, but also associated to standard multiple sclerosis, neuromyelitis optica, CADASIL and progressive multifocal leukoencephalopathy

There is an overlap between what is considered Baló concentric sclerosis and some atypical cases of multiple sclerosis. A special subtype of multiple sclerosis presents Baló-like lesions (pattern III lesions) creating an intersection between these two conditions.

Some patients with BCS present oligoclonal bands while others do not. It has been proposed that BCS lesions may not denote a single disease, but a final pathway of various demyelinating diseases, reflecting the presence of intralesional hypoxia as recently proposed

Recently it has been reported that pattern III lesions are responsive to Mitoxantrone. On the other hand, this pattern is the less responsive to plasmapheresis

Pattern III lesions can be diagnosed without a biopsy because these patients show a high reactivity to AQP1 (without antibody) and varicella zoster virus (VZV).

Origin of the lesions

Pattern III lesions were for sometime thought to be a MS nascent lesion, though it is not likely anymore. A strain of bacterium Clostridium perfringens has been found in Pattern III lesions. Tests in mice found that a toxin made by a rare strain of C. perfringens caused MS-like damage in the brain, and earlier work had identified this strain of C. perfringens in a human with MS. MS patients were found to be 10 times more immune-reactive to the epsilon toxin than healthy people.

Later reports state that Baló's patients showed loss of AQP1 and AQP4 in demyelinating lesions without binding auto-antibodies but with high reactivities to AQP1 peptides, which probably reflect astrocytic damage

History

Though the disease carries the name of József Baló, it was first described by Otto Marburg in 1906. Later, in 1928, József Baló studied the encephalitis periaxialis concentrica in a Hungarian patient, showing also demyelination of the peripheral nervous system.

See also
 Multiple sclerosis
 The Lesion Project
 Tumefactive multiple sclerosis

References

External links 

Demyelinating diseases of CNS
Autoimmune diseases
Rare diseases